OPAL (OPtimized Applicative Language) is a functional programming language first developed at the Technical University of Berlin.

Example program
This is an example OPAL program, which calculates the GCD recursively.

 Signature file (declaration)

    SIGNATURE GCD
    FUN GCD: nat ** nat -> nat

 Implementation file (definition)

    IMPLEMENTATION GCD
    IMPORT Nat COMPLETELY
    DEF GCD(a,b) == IF a % b = 0 THEN b
                        ELSE IF a-b < b THEN GCD(b,a-b)
                            ELSE GCD(a-b,b)
                        FI
                    FI

External links
 The OPAL Home Page
 OPAL Installation Guide

Functional languages